Olearia microdisca, commonly known as small-flowered daisy-bush, is a species of flowering plant in the family Asteraceae and is endemic to Kangaroo Island, South Australia. It is a compact shrub with small, crowded, oblong leaves and white and yellow, daisy-like inflorescences.

Description
The upper surface of the leaves is glabrous, the lower surface is woolly-hairy and the edges are rolled under. The heads or daisy-like "flowers" are arranged singly on the ends of erect branches and sessile.

Taxonomy
Olearia microdisca was first formally described in 1928 by John McConnell Black in Transactions and Proceedings of the Royal Society of South Australia.

Distribution and habitat
Small-flowered daisy-bush grows in heath and mallee and is restricted to Kangaroo Island in South Australia.

Conservation status
Olearia microdisca is listed as "endangered" under the Australian Government Environment Protection and Biodiversity Conservation Act 1999. A recovery plan for nationally threatened plant species on Kangaroo Island, including O. microdisca, has been prepared.

References

Asterales of Australia
Flora of South Australia
microdisca
Plants described in 1928
Taxa named by John McConnell Black